François Chavane (1910–1992) was a French film producer and screenwriter.

Selected filmography
 Beautiful Star (1938)
 Marie-Martine (1943)
 The Man from London (1943)
 The Eleventh Hour Guest (1945)
 Darling Caroline (1951)
 Two Pennies Worth of Violets (1951)
 Crimson Curtain (1952)
 A Caprice of Darling Caroline (1953)
 Les hommes ne pensent qu'à ça (1954)
 Caroline and the Rebels (1955)
 The Adventures of Arsène Lupin (1957)
 Signé Arsène Lupin (1959)
 The Fenouillard Family (1961)
 Coplan Takes Risks (1964)
 Untamable Angelique (1967)
 Angelique and the Sultan (1968)

References

Bibliography 
 Van Heuckelom. Polish Migrants in European Film 1918–2017. Springer, 2019.

External links 
 

1910 births
1992 deaths
French film producers
Film people from Paris
20th-century French screenwriters

fr:François Chavane